The Mont Durand Glacier is a 5.9 km long glacier (2005) situated in the Grand Combin massif, Pennine Alps, in the canton of Valais in Switzerland. In 1973 it had an area of 7.5 km².

See also
List of glaciers in Switzerland
Swiss Alps

References

Glaciers of Valais
Glaciers of the Alps